The 185th New York State Legislature, consisting of the New York State Senate and the New York State Assembly, met from January 5, 1983, to December 31, 1984, during the first and second years of Mario Cuomo's governorship, in Albany.

Background
On May 8, 1982, Senate Republicans and Assembly Democrats announced that they had agreed upon a new apportionment. The number of seats in the State Senate was increased from 60 to 61. The new district lines were gerrymandered by the Republican Senate majority to increase Republican strength, and by the Democratic Assembly majority to increase Democratic strength.

On June 23, 1982, a special panel of three federal judges ordered Special Master Robert P. Patterson Jr. to revise the new apportionment proposed by the Legislature.

On July 3, 1982, the revised re-apportionment was approved by the U.S. Department of Justice.

Thus, under the provisions of the New York Constitution of 1938 and the U.S. Supreme Court decision to follow the One man, one vote rule, re-apportioned in 1982 by the Legislature, 61 Senators and 150 assemblymen were elected in single-seat districts for two-year terms. Senate and Assembly districts consisted of approximately the same number of inhabitants, the area being apportioned contiguously without restrictions regarding county boundaries.

At this time there were two major political parties: the Democratic Party and the Republican Party. The Conservative Party, the Liberal Party, the Right to Life Party, the Libertarian Party, a "Statewide Independent Party", a "Unity Party", the New Alliance Party, and the Socialist Workers Party also nominated tickets.

Elections
The New York state election, 1982, was held on November 2. Lieutenant Governor Mario Cuomo was elected Governor, and Westchester County Executive Alfred DelBello was elected Lieutenant Governor, both Democrats. The elections to the other three statewide elective offices resulted in the re-election of the three incumbent officeholders: a Republican Comptroller, a Democratic Attorney General and a Democratic U.S. Senator. The approximate party strength at this election, as expressed by the vote for Governor, was: Democrats 2,560,000; Republicans 2,249,000; Conservatives 230,000; Liberals 116,000; Right to Life 52,000; Libertarians 17,000; Statewide Independents 16,000; Unity 6,000; New Alliance 5,000; and Socialist Workers 4,000.

Sixteen of the nineteen women members of the previous legislature—State Senators Carol Berman (Dem.), of Lawrence; Mary B. Goodhue (Rep.), a lawyer of Mount Kisco; Olga A. Méndez (Dem.), of East Harlem, and Linda Winikow (Dem.), of Spring Valley; and Assemblywomen Elizabeth Connelly (Dem.), of Staten Island; Pinny Cooke (Rep.), of Rochester; Geraldine L. Daniels (Dem.), of the Bronx; Gloria Davis (Dem.), of the Bronx; Eileen C. Dugan (Dem.), of Brooklyn; Aurelia Greene (Dem.), of the Bronx; Rhoda S. Jacobs (Dem.), of Brooklyn; Gerdi E. Lipschutz (Dem.), of Queens; May W. Newburger (Dem.), of Great Neck; Toni Rettaliata (Rep.), of Huntington; Gail S. Shaffer (Dem.), of North Blenheim; and Helene Weinstein (Dem.), a lawyer of Brooklyn—were re-elected. Anna V. Jefferson (Dem.), an accountant of Brooklyn, was also elected to the State Senate. Cynthia Jenkins (Dem.), a librarian of Queens; Helen M. Marshall (Dem.), a teacher and librarian of Queens; Nettie Mayersohn (Dem.), of Queens; Mary M. McPhillips (Dem.), of Middletown; Barbara Patton (Dem.), a lawyer of Hempstead; and Louise M. Slaughter (Dem.), of Fairport; were also elected to the Assembly. Gail S. Shaffer did not take her seat in the Assembly, and was appointed as Secretary of State of New York instead.

On May 24, 1983, Julia Harrison (Dem.), of Queens, was elected to fill a vacancy in the Assembly. Thus the 185th Legislature finished having 23 women members, surpassing the previous record of 19 in the 184th New York State Legislature (in 1982).

The New York state election, 1983, was held on November 8. One vacancy in the Assembly was filled.

Sessions
The Legislature met for the first regular session (the 206th) at the State Capitol in Albany on January 5, 1983; and recessed indefinitely on June 28.

Stanley Fink (Dem.) was re-elected Speaker of the Assembly.

Warren M. Anderson (Rep.) was re-elected Temporary President of the Senate.

The Legislature met for a special session on September 15, 1983, to consider changes to the laws concerning transportation of cargoes.

The Legislature met for the second regular session (the 207th) at the State Capitol in Albany on January 4, 1984; and recessed indefinitely shortly before 2 a.m. on July 1.

An hour after midnight, on May 30, the State Assembly rejected after a stormy debate of many hours the proposal to raise the legal drinking age from 19 to 21 years; the vote stood 80 to 69.

The Legislature met for another special session on December 6, 1984. At this session, the legislators raised the wages of the legislators who were elected to the next Legislature; approved a sales tax increase for Erie County; and extended a corporate tax surcharge used to subsidize the New York City mass transit system.

State Senate

Senators
The asterisk (*) denotes members of the previous Legislature who continued in office as members of this Legislature. Andrew Jenkins and Lloyd Stephen Riford Jr. changed from the Assembly to the Senate at the beginning of this Legislature. Assemblyman Leonard P. Stavisky was elected to fill a vacancy in the Senate.

Note: For brevity, the chairmanships omit the words "...the Committee on (the)..."

Employees
 Secretary: Stephen F. Sloan

State Assembly

Assemblymen
The asterisk (*) denotes members of the previous Legislature who continued in office as members of this Legislature.

Note: For brevity, the chairmanships omit the words "...the Committee on (the)..."

Employees
 Clerk: Catherine A. Carey

Notes

Sources
 VOTING IN NEW YORK STATE FOR 61 SEATS IN THE SENATE in The New York Times on November 4, 1982
 VOTE TOTALS FOR RACES IN THE NEW YORK STATE ASSEMBLY in The New York Times on November 4, 1982

185
1983 in New York (state)
1984 in New York (state)
1983 U.S. legislative sessions
1984 U.S. legislative sessions